Lingue may refer to:
 Lingue River
 Persea lingue, a tree.

See also 
 Linguee
 Lingui (disambiguation)